The Gaines–Oliphint House is a historic log cabin in Milam, Sabine County, Texas.

History
The house was built by slaves in 1818 for the third wife's parents of James Taylor Gaines (1776–1856), the second cousin of General Edmund P. Gaines (1777–1849). In 1843, he sold it to Martha A. Oliphint. In 1984, it belonged to Mrs. Tom Foster, who donated it to the Sons of the Republic of Texas, who in turn donated to the Daughters of the Republic of Texas. The latter organization held many fundraisers for its preservation.

Notable Texans, such as Sam Houston, Davy Crockett and Stephen F. Austin, have stayed in the log cabin.

It has been added to the National Register of Historic Places listings since August 18, 1977.

See also

National Register of Historic Places listings in Sabine County, Texas
Recorded Texas Historic Landmarks in Sabine County

References

National Register of Historic Places in Sabine County, Texas
Houses on the National Register of Historic Places in Texas
Houses completed in 1818
Houses in Sabine County, Texas
Log cabins in the United States
Log buildings and structures on the National Register of Historic Places in Texas